Point of No Return EP is the first EP by rapper Mr. Envi'. It was released on March 19, 2013.

Track listing

Point of No Return Intro — 1:31
Where U From (featuring JB) — 3:05
Re Up — 3:17
Skit — :45
Back It Off (featuring Jeramie) — 3:00
Laura (featuring MD) — 3:05
Outro — 1:00

References

2013 EPs
Mr. Envi' albums
Self-released EPs